The Gaea Trilogy consists of three science fiction novels by John Varley.  The stories tell of humanity's encounter with a living being in the shape of a 1,300 km diameter Stanford torus, inhabited by many different species, most notably the centaur-like Titanides, in orbit around the planet Saturn.

The novels are:
Titan (1979)
Nebula Award nominee, 1979; Hugo Award nominee, Locus Award winner, 1980
Wizard (1980)
Hugo and Locus Award nominees, 1981
Demon (1984)
Locus Award nominee, 1985

References

External links
 The Gaean Trilogy at Worlds Without End
 Gaea the Mad Titan fan site of the Gaean Trilogy

Science fiction book series
Science fiction novel trilogies
Novels by John Varley
Fiction set on Titan (moon)
Berkley Books books